Francis Michael Stams (born July 17, 1965) is a former American football defensive lineman who played at the University of Notre Dame. He played on the 1988 National Championship team. He would later play in the National Football League (NFL), where he was converted to linebacker.

"Football/basketball/baseball standout Frank Stams helped St. Vincent-St. Mary win back-to-back Division III state football championships in 1981 and '82, a Class AA state basketball title in 1984 and was also an All-American on Notre Dame's 1988 NCAA national championship football team. Notre Dame's storied program has not won a national title since Stams' senior year.

Stams earned a bachelor's degree in history at Notre Dame, then played three seasons with the Los Angeles Rams and four seasons with the Browns.

"When I got to Notre Dame, [coach] Gerry Faust had me running the ball a lot, but I was moved to defense when Lou Holtz became the coach," said Stams, a 1984 SVSM graduate. "I really missed not carrying the ball but the move turned out to be a blessing."

Stams currently resides in Cuyahoga Falls with his wife, Mari, son Mason, and daughter Rhiannon. Both of his children went to St. Vincent–St. Mary High School like Frank. His daughter now attends Miami University in Oxford, Ohio. He now works as vice president at Evans Insurance Agency in Akron, participates as a high school/Mid-American Conference football analyst for SportsTime Ohio, and is a volunteer for the Cleveland Browns Alumni Department. The former linebacker, who is 6-3 and weighed 240 pounds during his playing days, can be found on the golf course in his spare time, coaching youth football, basketball and baseball or fishing with his children." In 2019, Stams was elected to serve on the Cuyahoga Falls City Council, serving as a Councilman for the City's 8th ward.

References

1965 births
Living people
All-American college football players
American football linebackers
Cleveland Browns players
Kansas City Chiefs players
Los Angeles Rams players
Notre Dame Fighting Irish football players
St. Vincent–St. Mary High School alumni